Miki McFadden (born January 24, 1948) is an American volleyball player. She competed in the women's tournament at the 1968 Summer Olympics.

References

External links
 

1948 births
Living people
American women's volleyball players
Olympic volleyball players of the United States
Volleyball players at the 1968 Summer Olympics
Volleyball players from Honolulu
USC Trojans women's volleyball players